The second season of the American fictional drama television series ER first aired on September 21, 1995, and concluded on May 16, 1996.  The second season consists of 22 episodes.

Plot
Greene's attempts at balancing his work and family after moving to Milwaukee comes to an abrupt end when his wife is caught cheating on him with a colleague, the divorce becomes final and he starts dating again. At work, he is promoted, becoming an attending physician. He locks horns with close friend Dr. Doug Ross, whose reckless professional behavior is called into question by the hospital authorities, and new Chief Resident, Dr. Kerry Weaver. Ross breaks protocol to treat an HIV-positive child and is about to be fired.  He has already accepted a job at another medical facility when he heroically saves a child, trapped in a sewer in the landmark episode "Hell and High Water". His heroism creates a media sensation and the hospital reconsiders its decision when Dr. Ross receives an award for outstanding community service. Later in the season, his father returns, and while attempting to bond his father again walks out on him. While tracking him down Doug becomes embroiled in a relationship with his father's girlfriend.   
    
Lewis is left holding the baby when her sister, Chloe, skips town, leaving daughter Suzie in Susan's care. She struggles to find time to care for the child and complete her residency. She considers having Suzie adopted, but at the last minute decides to keep her. Just as Susan starts to become attached to the baby, Chloe returns, a changed woman, and a short custody battle ensues. Eventually, Susan hands Suzie over to Chloe and is left devastated when her sister and her new husband move to Phoenix, taking the baby with them.   
    
Carter, now a fourth-year medical student, starts a relationship with medical student Harper Tracy. He becomes involved in the treatment of an elderly patient and her husband (played by comic Red Buttons) in order to secure his place in developing a new heart procedure study and a spot in the surgical program.  After the surgery is complete, the woman's condition deteriorates and Carter is overwhelmed by the husband's constant needs.  The woman's subsequent death results in tremendous personal guilt, but Carter still manages to win a place as a surgical intern despite the fierce competition. Hathaway becomes involved with paramedic Ray "Shep" Shepard. Their relationship develops quickly and they move in together. However, things go wrong when Shep's partner, Raul, suffers third degree burns to over 85% of his body during a fire rescue and dies shortly afterward, resulting in emotional crisis and guilt for Shep. Shep grows volatile and violent, and after he refuses Carol's recommendation that he see a psychiatrist, the couple separates.

At the start of the season, Dr. Benton is in a relationship with Jeanie Boulet. She ends the relationship in a bid to save her marriage, but soon starts working as a physician assistant at County General. Benton is frosty towards her and is angry when he finds out about her divorce from her husband. At the end of the season, Jeanie finds out that she may be HIV-positive after her ex-husband, Al, is diagnosed. She informs a dismayed Peter and suggests that he too be tested. Benton also struggles to decide whether to lodge a formal complaint against his mentor Dr. Vucelich, when he discovers irregularities in his research method.

Production
First season executive producers John Wells and Michael Crichton reprised their roles. Wells continued to serve as the series head writer and showrunner. Lydia Woodward and Mimi Leder returned as co-executive producers. New producer Carol Flint filled the third co-executive producer position following the departure of Robert Nathan. Christopher Chulack continued to act as the episodic producer. Paul Manning and Wendy Spence Rosato also continued in their first season roles as producer and associate producer respectively. Several changes occurred with the production team mid-season - Leder left the crew, Manning was promoted to supervising producer, and Spence Rosato was promoted to co-producer.

Wells, Woodward, Flint, and Manning continued to regularly write episodes, with each contributing to four episodes this season. First season regular writers Neal Baer and Lance Gentile became story editors for the second season and continued to write episodes. Baer contributed to two episodes while Gentile continued to act as the series medical consultant and wrote a further episode. Both were promoted to executive story editors by the close of the season. First season writer Tracey Stern also returned and contributed a further episode. First season technical adviser Joe Sachs reprised his role and also made his television writing debut on the second season. The series other new writers were Belinda Casas Wells and Anne Kenney; Casas Wells contributed to the story of an episode and Kenney wrote a single episode.

Leder and Chulack continued to regularly direct episodes. Returning first season directors Félix Enríquez Alcalá and Donna Deitch each directed further episodes in the second season. New directors Thomas Schlamme and Lesli Linka Glatter each contributed two episodes this season. Crew members Lance Gentile and Director of Photography Richard Thorpe both made their episode directing debuts this season. Cast member Anthony Edwards also directed his first episode. Other directors new to the series include Eric Laneuville, Dean Parisot, Whitney Ransick, and Barnet Kellman.

Cast

Main cast
 Anthony Edwards as Dr. Mark Greene – Attending Physician
 George Clooney as Dr. Doug Ross – Pediatric Emergency Medicine Fellow
 Sherry Stringfield as Dr. Susan Lewis – Resident PGY-3
 Noah Wyle as John Carter – Fourth year Medical Student
 Julianna Margulies as Nurse Carol Hathaway – Nurse Manager
 Gloria Reuben as Jeanie Boulet – Physician Assistant
 Eriq La Salle as Dr. Peter Benton – Surgical Resident PGY-3

Supporting cast

Doctors and Medical students
 William H. Macy as Dr. David Morgenstern – Chief of Surgery and Emergency Medicine
 Amy Aquino as Dr. Janet Coburn – Chief of Obstetrics and Gynecology
 CCH Pounder as Dr. Angela Hicks – Surgical Attending Physician
 Laura Innes as Dr. Kerry Weaver – Chief Resident
 Ron Rifkin as Dr. Carl Vucelich – Cardiothoracic Surgeon
 Scott Jaeck as Dr. Steve Flint – Chief of Radiology
 Christine Elise as Harper Tracy – Third Year Medical Student
 Matthew Glave as Dale Edson – Fourth Year Medical Student
 Michael Buchman Silver as Dr. Paul Meyers – Psychiatric Resident
Megan Cole as Dr. Alice Upton – Pathologist
 Perry Anzilotti as Dr. Ed – Anesthesiologist 
 Michael Bryan French as Dr. MacGruder
 Pierre Epstein as Dr. Bradley – Chief of Staff
 David Spielberg as Dr. Neil Bernstein – Chief of Pediatrics
 Richard Minchenberg as Dr. P.K. Simon

Nurses
 Ellen Crawford as Nurse Lydia Wright
Conni Marie Brazelton as Nurse Conni Oligario
 Deezer D as Nurse Malik McGrath
 Laura Cerón as Nurse Chuny Marquez
 Yvette Freeman as Nurse Haleh Adams
 Lily Mariye as Nurse Lily Jarvik
 Vanessa Marquez as Nurse Wendy Goldman
 Suzanne Carney as OR Nurse Janet

Staff, Paramedics and Officers
 Abraham Benrubi as Desk Clerk Jerry Markovic
 Kristin Minter as Desk Clerk Miranda "Randi" Fronczak
 Charles Noland as Desk Clerk E. Ray (E-Ray) Bozman
Rolando Molina as Desk Clerk Rolando
 Ron Eldard as Paramedic Ray "Shep" Shepard
 Carlos Gomez as Paramedic Raul Melendez
 Małgorzata Gebel as ER aide (Dr.) Bogdanilivestsky 'Bob' Romansky
Emily Wagner as Paramedic Doris Pickman
 Montae Russell as Paramedic Dwight Zadro
 as Paramedic Pamela Olbes
Scott Michael Campbell as EMT Reilley Brown
Lee R. Sellars as Chopper EMT
Mike Genovese as Officer Al Grabarsky
 Chad McKnight as Officer Wilson

Family
 Christine Harnos as Jennifer "Jenn" Greene
 Yvonne Zima as Rachel Greene
 Kathleen Wilhoite as Chloe Lewis
 Paul Dooley as Harry Lewis
 Valerie Perrine as Cookie Lewis
 Michael C. Mahon	as Joe (Chloe's Boyfriend)
 Michael Beach as Al Boulet
 Khandi Alexander as Jackie Robbins
 Ving Rhames as Walter Robbins
 James Farentino as Ray Ross
 Piper Laurie as Sarah Ross

Notable guest stars
 Mary Mara as Loretta Sweet
 Jake Lloyd as Jimmy Sweet
 Andrea Parker as Linda Ferrell
 Lucy Liu as Mei-Sun
 Joan Pringle as Hyams
 Red Buttons as Mr. Rubadoux
 Ja'net Du Bois as Macy Chamberlain
 Lindsay Crouse as Dr. Anna Castiglioni
 Scottie Pippen as himself
 Richard Schiff as Mr. Bartoli
 Joanna Gleason as Iris
 Marg Helgenberger as Karen Hines
 Robert Picardo as Mr Zimble
 Adam Goldberg as Joshua Shem
 Guillermo Díaz as Jorge
 Carol Ann Susi as Pregnant Alien-Abductee 
 Bradley Whitford as Sean O'Brien

Episodes

Reception
ER second season proved to be very popular and it became the number 1 show in the US. Nielsen Viewer ratings and viewers were also exceedingly high, especially for "Hell and High Water".

British magazine Empire found the best ER episode was the seventh titled "Hell And High Water" where "Doug Ross (George Clooney) saves a young boy from drowning during a flood."

DVD features
Region 1 DVDs have subtitles available in English, French and Spanish.

Audio commentaries are available for episodes 1 and 16, with Mimi Leder, editor Randy Jon Morgan, and Laura Innes).

References

External links 
 

1995 American television seasons
1996 American television seasons
ER (TV series) seasons